Jim Guest is an American politician, former aerospace engineer, and former Republican member of the Missouri House of Representatives from District 5.

He was first elected to the Missouri House of Representatives in 2002, winning reelection in 2004, 2006, and 2008. By Missouri term limit law, Guest was ineligible to run again in 2010.

Guest has been a supporter of legislation to address electronic harassment.

References
Official Manual, State of Missouri, 2005-2006. Jefferson City, MO: Secretary of State.

1940 births
Living people
People from King City, Missouri
Missouri University of Science and Technology alumni
Politicians from St. Louis
Missouri Republicans
20th-century Methodists
21st-century Methodists
American United Methodists